A Dream of Kings is a 1969 drama film directed by Daniel Mann and written by Ian McLellan Hunter, adapted from the novel of the same name by Harry Mark Petrakis. The film stars Anthony Quinn, Irene Papas, Sam Levene and Inger Stevens in her final role, as she committed suicide two months after the film's release. Critics raved over Quinn's performance and those of the supporting cast.

Plot
Matsoukas, a Chicago-based Greek-American married to his long-suffering wife Caliope, learns that his son is dying. Convinced that the child will fare better in Greece, Matsoukas attempts to raise the airfare to send the family there. However, all of his sources of income vanish until he is forced to fix a dice game to raise the cash. His wife eventually raises the money by stealing from her mother. There is only enough for two seats. In the end, she sends Matsoukas and the boy off with tearful embraces. On the plane, Matsoukas looks around him and begins to smile.

Cast
Anthony Quinn as Matsoukas
Irene Papas as Caliope
Inger Stevens as Anna
Sam Levene as Cicero
Val Avery as Fatsas
Radames Pera as Stavros
Tamara Daykarhanova as Mother-in-law
Peter Mamakos as Falconis
James Dobson as Doctor
Zvee Scooler as Zenoitis
Bill Walker as Kampana
Hard Boiled Haggerty as Turk
Alan Reed, Sr. as Fig King

Home video
A Dream of Kings was released as a Region 1 fullscreen DVD by Warner Home Video on March 23, 2009 via its Warner Archive MOD (manufacture-on-demand) service.

See also
 List of American films of 1969

References

External links
 
 
 
 

1969 films
1969 drama films
American drama films
Films scored by Alex North
Films based on American novels
Films directed by Daniel Mann
Films set in Chicago
Films shot in Chicago
1960s English-language films
1960s American films